The 1959 Sam Houston State Bearkats football team represented Sam Houston State Teachers College (now known as Sam Houston State University) as a member of the Lone Star Conference (LSC)  during the 1959 NAIA football season. Led by eighth-year head coach Paul Pierce, the Bearkats compiled an overall record of 5–5 with a mark of 3–4 in conference play, and finished tied for fifth in the LSC.

Schedule

References

Sam Houston State
Sam Houston Bearkats football seasons
Sam Houston State Bearkats football